The 1876 East Kent by-election was held on 26 July 1876.  The byelection was held due to the resignation of the incumbent Conservative MP, Wyndham Knatchbull.  It was won by the Conservative candidate William Deedes junior.

The by-election was unopposed by-election.  William Deedes senior, his father had previously represented the same constituency, from 1845 to 1857 and from 1857 to 1862, but William junior's political career was shorter, as he stood down from Parliament at the 1880 general election.

References

1876 elections in the United Kingdom
1876 in England
19th century in Kent
July 1876 events
By-elections to the Parliament of the United Kingdom in Kent constituencies
Unopposed by-elections to the Parliament of the United Kingdom in English constituencies